In the design of floor systems in buildings  vibrations caused by walking, dancing, mechanical equipment or other rhythmic excitation may cause an annoyance to the occupants or impede the function of sensitive equipment.  A calculation procedure to analyze steel framed floor systems is given in a design guide published by the American Institute of Steel Construction. Enhanced or increased leasing activity in office buildings resulting in higher building occupancy has also been attributed to increased floor vibration.  

Modern concrete under-floors often specify a 3mm layer of sound-deadening material above (is it foam plastic like ethaline - something with a long-life since it will be expensive to replace).

See also 

 Architectural acoustics

External links 
 American Institute of Steel Construction
 Floor Vibration Analysis Software

Building defects
Floors